Michalis Pelekanos (alternate spelling: Mihalis, Greek: Μιχάλης Πελεκάνος; born May 25, 1981) is a Greek professional basketball player. During his pro club career, at a height of 199 cm (6'6") tall, Pelekanos played primarily at the small forward position. However, he also played as a shooting guard in the early part of his career, and as a power forward, in the latter part of his career. During his playing career, Pelekanos was mostly known for his spectacular athletic ability and defensive prowess.

With the Greek club Olympiacos Piraeus, Pelekanos won the EuroLeague championship at the 2012 EuroLeague Final Four. Pelekanos also represented the senior Greek national team at the 2008 Beijing Summer Olympics.

Early life and youth career
Pelekanos was born on 25 May 1981, in Koridalos, Piraeus, Athens, Greece. At a young age, he began playing the sport of basketball with the youth teams of the Greek sports club Peristeri. The club is based in Peristeri, which is a suburb of Athens.

Professional career
Pelekanos began his pro career in Greece, with Peristeri Athens of the Greek Basket League. He later joined the Greek club AEK Athens, followed by the Greek club Panellinios Athens. After a career year at Panellinios, in the 2006–07 season, in which he made the home crowd fans of Panellinios chant his name during games, due to his exciting defensive plays, run down blocked shots, and highlight reel slam dunks, Pelekanos moved to the EuroLeague giants Real Madrid, of the Spanish ACB League.

In 2008, Pelekanos signed a 3-year contract worth €2.1 million euros net income, with the Greek club Olympiacos Piraeus. In August 2009, he was loaned by Olympiacos to the Greek club Maroussi Athens. With Olympiacos, he won both the EuroLeague and Greek League championships,in 2012.

Pelekanos then signed with the Greek club Aris Thessaloniki, for the 2012–13 season. In July 2014, he moved to the Romanian National League club CSU Ploiești, on a one-year deal. With Ploiești, he won the Romanian League's championship.

In July 2015, Pelekanos returned to Aris, after he signed a two-year contract with the club. He was officially released from the team on July 21, 2016. He then moved to the Greek club Panionios Athens, where he played for one season, in the Greek 2nd Division.

Pelekanos spent the 2019–20 season with the Greek 1st Division club Ifaistos Limnou. In his pro club career, Pelekanos played in the European top-tier level EuroLeague, in a total of nine different seasons, with five different teams (Peristeri, AEK Athens, Real Madrid, Olympiacos, and Maroussi).

National team career
After playing with Greece's Under-20 junior national team in the youth categories, Pelekanos was a member of the senior men's Greek national team. Pelekanos played in his first major tournament with Greece, at the 2007 EuroBasket, where Greece finished the tournament in fourth place. He also competed with the senior Greek national team at the 2008 FIBA World OQT, and at the 2008 Summer Olympics, where Greece finished the tournament in fifth place.

References

External links
Euroleague.net Profile
FIBA Profile
FIBA Europe Profile
ProBallers.com Profile
Eurobasket.com Profile
RealGM.com Profile
Basketball-Reference.com Profile
Greek Basket League Profile 
Hellenic Basketball Federation Profile 
Spanish League Profile 
Draftexpress.com Profile

1981 births
Living people
AEK B.C. players
Aris B.C. players
Basketball players at the 2008 Summer Olympics
Basketball players from Athens
CSU Asesoft Ploiești players
Greek men's basketball players
Greek Basket League players
Ifaistos Limnou B.C. players
Liga ACB players
Maroussi B.C. players
Oiakas Nafpliou B.C. players
Olympiacos B.C. players
Olympic basketball players of Greece
Panellinios B.C. players
Panionios B.C. players
Peristeri B.C. players
Power forwards (basketball)
Real Madrid Baloncesto players
Shooting guards
Small forwards